Rekha Boyalapalli (born 5 April 1986) is an Indian tennis player.

Biography
Rekha Boyalapalli Alias Dr Rekha Goud after learning the basics of Tennis in Hyderabad and later in Mumbai. She attended an intensive training camp in Spain and began participating in AITA tournaments from 2017.

She participated in International Tennis Federation (ITF) tournaments in Thailand in November 2018 and Egypt in May 2019. 

She emerged singles champion in the national ranking tournament conducted by Pradhan Tennis Academy besides being semi-finalist four times in AITA tournaments.  As a tennis player in November 2018 she stood No 54 in the All India Tennis Association (AITA) rankings. 

In the year 2020 during the COVID-19 pandemic, she was running charity to help the needy with food.

ITF Circuit Finals

Singles: 3 (0 titles, 3 runner–ups)

Reference

External links 
 
 
 Rekha Foundation Help to Migrant Workers in Hyderabad | TV5 News
 REKHA BOYALAPALLI official website
 COVID -19 “SEVA RATNA AWARD
 REKHA CHARITABLE FOUNDATION | TV5 NEWS
 REKHA FOUNDATION DISTRIBUTES FOOD FOR POOR PEOPLE | TV5 NEWS

1983 births
Living people
Indian female tennis players
Racket sportspeople from Hyderabad, India
Sportswomen from Telangana